Chvaletice is a town in Pardubice District in the Pardubice Region of the Czech Republic. It has about 2,900 inhabitants.

Administrative parts
The village of Hornická Čtvrť is an administrative part of Chvaletice.

Geography
It lies in the Polabí region; the northern part of the municipal territory lies in the East Elbe Table and the southern part lies in the northwestern tip of the Iron Mountains. The river Elbe forms the northern municipal border.

History
In the area there were originally two villages, Telčice and Chvaletice, both administered by Chvaletice. The first written mention of Telčice comes from 1143 and of Chvaletice from 1393.

Ownership of the place has changed several times between king, monastery and local nobles. The Thirty Years' War followed by forced conversion to Catholicism depopulated the area but the tradition of Protestantism survived. The railway Pardubice–Prague built in 1845 brought the village into the modern age.

In 1953 Telčice became a separate municipality, however in 1975 Telčice and Chvaletice were merged into one municipality. In 1981 Chvaletice obtained town rights.

Economy
Since ancient times iron ore was mined here, until the Thirty Years' War; then again since the end of 18th century. Mining of pyrite-manganium ore started in the 20th century. The mines got exhausted and were finally closed in 1975.

In 1973–1979, the Chvaletice Power Station was built, with the coal being moved in from mines in northern Bohemia by ships on the Elbe river. To make such shipping possible large excavation works (Elbe Waterway project) on the riverbed were carried out. Use of ships stopped in 1996.

References

External links

Populated places in Pardubice District
Cities and towns in the Czech Republic